Bujić is a village located in the municipality of Preševo, Serbia. According to the 2002 census, the village has a population of 89 people of which 88 are Albanian and 1 other.

References

Populated places in Pčinja District
Albanian communities in Serbia